...The Dandy Warhols Come Down is the second studio album by American rock band The Dandy Warhols. It was released on July 15, 1997, by Capitol.

Three singles were released from the album: "Not If You Were the Last Junkie on Earth", "Every Day Should Be a Holiday" and "Boys Better".

This is the final studio album to feature drummer Eric Hedford, who quit the band during the tour, and was replaced with Taylor-Taylor's cousin Brent DeBoer.

Recording and The Black Album 

The band's first effort for Capitol Records was an album which was recorded before Come Down called The Black Album, which was rejected by Capitol for, according to frontman Courtney Taylor-Taylor, containing "no hit songs". It was later released as a double album in 2004 with Come On Feel the Dandy Warhols, an album composed of B-sides and previously unreleased material.

After rejecting "The Black Album" Capitol reached out to Tony Lash, who had co-produced Dandys Rule OK, to produce. ...The Dandy Warhols Come Down was recorded in 1996-1997 at Sound Impressions, Stiles Recording, Falcon Studios, and Courtney Taylor-Taylor's apartment in Portland, Oregon.

According to Taylor-Taylor, it took the band a long time to get noticed by major labels, due to the prevalence of the grunge scene in the Pacific Northwest. In a June 1997 interview with Billboard, he remarked, "When we came up, there were a group of bands that didn't get recognition because people weren't appreciating what it was we were doing. A lot of us were more influenced by Galaxie 500 than the post-pubescent, fanzine, Nirvana-angst, college thing that was so prevalent at the time."

Musical style 

The album featured a shift in style from the garage rock influenced sound of their previous album, 1995's Dandys Rule OK, to a more and pop-influenced sound.

Taylor compared the track "Good Morning" to the style of musician Lloyd Cole.

Release 

...The Dandy Warhols Come Down was released on July 15, 1997, by Capitol.

Three singles were released from the album: "Not If You Were the Last Junkie on Earth", which helped to establish the band's popularity; "Every Day Should Be a Holiday", which reached No. 29 on the UK Singles Chart; and "Boys Better", which reached No. 36 on the same chart.

It is the final album with founding member Eric Hedford, who was replaced by frontman Courtney Taylor-Taylor's cousin Brent DeBoer in 1998.

Reception 

...The Dandy Warhols Come Down has sold 103,000 copies in the U.S. as of 2008.

The album has received a generally positive reception from critics. AllMusic criticized the album's consistency, writing, "the band has talent for not just punchy hooks but for layered sonics as well, but they don't know how to meld the two together." Rolling Stone, on the other hand, called it "the most exhilarating '60s-into-'90s excursion yet attempted by an American band", following with "if this is The Dandy Warhols coming down, the mind boggles at the thought of them flying high."

Legacy 

The album was included in the book 1001 Albums You Must Hear Before You Die. Pitchfork also included it in their The Best Britpop Albums... That Aren't British list.

"Boys Better" was featured on the soundtrack for the films Good Will Hunting, Igby Goes Down, Jay and Silent Bob Strike Back and Jay and Silent Bob Reboot. "Every Day Should Be a Holiday" was featured in the movie There's Something About Mary, Fanboys and the trailer for Sideways

Track listing

Personnel 

The Dandy Warhols
 Courtney Taylor-Taylor – lead vocals, guitar, mixing on "Whipping Tree", production and album sleeve design and art direction
 Peter Holmström – guitar, additional vocals
 Zia McCabe – keyboard bass, keyboards, percussion, additional vocals
 Eric Hedford – drums, backing vocals

Additional personnel
 Tony Lash – keyboards, percussion, drums on "Minnesoter"
 Aquaman – additional production on "Every Day Should Be a Holiday"
 Steven Birch – album design and art direction
 Jeff Bizzell – sleeve photography (larger live photos)
 Tchad Blake – mixing on tracks 1–7 and 10–12 at: Sunset Sound Factory, Hollywood, California
 Mario Caldato Jr. – mixing and additional production on "The Creep Out" at Bundy's, Los Angeles, California
 S. Husky Höskulds – engineering assistance
 Lisa Johnson – sleeve photography
 Mario Lalich – album cover photography
 Tony Lash – production, recording; mixing on "Good Morning" and "Pete International Airport" at White Horse Studios, Portland, Oregon
 Bob Ludwig – mastering at Gateway Mastering, Portland, Maine
 Mickey Petralia – mixing on "The Creep Out"
 David Schiffman – additional recording
 Clark Stiles – additional recording

Charts

Certifications

References

External links 
 
 

The Dandy Warhols albums
1997 albums
Capitol Records albums
Albums produced by Tony Lash